Anna Fang is a Chinese venture capitalist. She is the founding CEO and partner of ZhenFund.

Biography 
Fang graduated from Westtown School in 2000, then received her BA from Columbia University in 2004 and received her MBA from Stanford Graduate School of Business in 2010. She started her career as an investment banker at JPMorgan after graduating from Columbia before working for a Chinese cultural organization in the United Kingdom. After graduating from Stanford, she started at General Electric China in business development before being approached by her Stanford classmate to help Chinese investor Xu Xiaoping launch a new venture capital fund, now known as ZhenFund.

Fang has funded more than 30 seed-stage startups that have gone on to be unicorns, including the internet platform Xiaohongshu, Horizon Robotics, Huobi, VIPKid, and Nuro.

In April 2022, she was named #1 on Forbes magazine's debut Midas Seed List for "building the world's best seed-stage startup portfolio" and was named #12 on the Midas List, being the highest ranked woman on the list.

Fang is considered one of the most influential angel investors in China.

Fang sits on the board of Columbia Global Centers, East Asia. She is a recipient of Columbia College's John Jay Award in 2022.

Personal life and family 
Fang is the daughter of prominent Chinese investment banker Fang Fenglei, who helped found China International Capital Corporation and served as the Chairman of Goldman Sachs's China division. She married investor Gunther Hamm in Beijing in 2010.

References 

Living people
Chinese investors
Chinese investment bankers
General Electric people
JPMorgan Chase people
Columbia College (New York) alumni
Stanford Graduate School of Business alumni
Chinese venture capitalists
Westtown School alumni
Year of birth missing (living people)
Midas List